Schley Middle High School is located in the town of Ellaville, Georgia, United States. It is part of the Schley County School District, which covers residents of Ellaville and Murrays Crossroads. The middle school serves grades 6 through 8, while the high school serves grades 9 through 12. The school colors are black, white, and silver. The school mascot is the Wildcat.

The school is located at 2131 Highway 19 South in Ellaville. Construction on the current location began in 1999 and was completed in July 2000, with the first classes beginning in August 2000. As of the 2014/2015 school year, 708 students attended Schley County Middle High School.

In 2015, Schley Middle High School received a bronze-level award from U.S. News & World Report.

Athletics

Football 
Schley Middle High School has a varsity football team and a middle school team.
In 2016 Schley County hired a new head coach in the wake of an 0-10 season. Darren Alford accepted the job to become the new head coach and also took on the role of strength and conditioning coach. The 2016 season was Alford's first season ever as a head coach of a high school football team. Alford came from West Laurens High School in Dublin, Georgia. At West Laurens Alford was the offensive coordinator and strength and conditioning coach. Prior to his time at West Laurens, Alford also coached at Americus High School, where he won a state championship in the 2000-2001 season.  When Alford took the job as the head coach at Schley County, he knew the challenges it would bring being that the Wildcats football team put less than 45 points on the score board in 2015. The 2016 season proved that Alford has the Schley county football team on the rise. The Wildcats went 4-6 and scored 189 points while allowing 236. The hiring of Darren Alford as the Schley County head coach proved to be the right hire for the Schley County Board of Education. Only time will tell if Alford can lead the Wildcats to their playoff game since 2008.

Basketball 
Schley Middle High School has the following basketball teams: varsity boys, varsity girls, junior varsity boys, junior varsity girls, middle school boys, and middle school girls.

Baseball 
Schley Middle High School has a varsity baseball team, a junior varsity baseball team, and a middle school team. In May 2015, Schley's varsity baseball team won the GHSA A State Championship for the first time in the school's history.

Golf 
Schley Middle High School has a golf team that is open to boys and girls.

Softball 
Schley Middle High School has varsity, junior varsity, and middle school softball teams.

Track and field 
Schley Middle High School has a high school varsity track and field team and a middle school team.

Cross country 
Schley Middle High School has a high school varsity cross country team and a middle school cross country team.

References 

Public middle schools in Georgia (U.S. state)
Public high schools in Georgia (U.S. state)
Education in Schley County, Georgia